Jacques Jacobus Polak (25 April 1914 – 26 February 2010) was a Dutch economist. He received his doctorate in economics in 1937 from the University of Amsterdam. His first professional work was with Professor Jan Tinbergen. In 1937 he began his international service as an economist with the League of Nations. He was a member of the Netherlands delegations to the 1944 Bretton Woods Conference establishing the International Monetary Fund and to the Atlantic City conference that established the United Nations Relief and Rehabilitation Administration (UNRRA).  During this period, he served at the Dutch Embassy in Washington.  From 1944 to 1946, he was an Assistant Financial Adviser, and then Economic Adviser to the Director General of UNRRA.

He joined the staff of the International Monetary Fund in January 1947, serving first as Chief of the Statistics Division, and then as Assistant Director, Deputy Director, and from 1958, as Director, of Research.  In 1966, he also became the Economic Counsellor of the Fund, a position which he held until his retirement from the Fund staff in 1979. After serving briefly as Adviser to the Managing Director, he was elected in January 1981 as Executive Director of the Fund for the constituency of Cyprus, Israel, the Netherlands, Romania, and Yugoslavia.  He served with distinction as an Executive Director until 1986 when he retired for a second time. Subsequently, in addition to engaging in a full agenda of research and writing, he served as a Consultant with the World Bank, as a Senior Adviser to the Development Center of the Organisation for Economic Co-operation and Development (OECD), and, after 1987, as President of the Per Jacobsson Foundation.

The International Monetary Fund recently honored Polak by naming its annual research conference after him.

Jacques Polak’s first publication appeared in 1937.  He wrote more than ninety papers and six books. One of his main contributions was an analytic model published in an article by Polak in 1957 and today known as the Polak Model.

Polak was elected a corresponding member of the Royal Netherlands Academy of Arts and Sciences in 1978.

Selected publications

 .
 .
 .

References

 J.J. Polak at the University of Amsterdam Album Academicum website

Further reading
 .
 Polak, J. J., (1957), Monetary Analysis of Income Formation and Payments Problems, IMF Staff Papers, 6, issue 1, p. 1–50.

1914 births
2010 deaths
Dutch economists
Dutch expatriates in the United States
Fellows of the Econometric Society
Members of the Royal Netherlands Academy of Arts and Sciences
OECD officials
University of Amsterdam alumni
World Bank people
Writers from Rotterdam